Fort Cornwallis is a bastion fort in George Town, Penang, Malaysia, built by the British East India Company in the late 18th century. It is the largest standing fort in Malaysia. The fort never engaged in combat during its operational history.

It was named after the then Lieutenant-General The 2nd Earl Cornwallis (1738–1805), the Governor-General of Bengal at the time of the fort's construction. He had also been involved in the American War of Independence, surrendering his army to George Washington at Yorktown in 1781. In 1792, Lord Cornwallis was later created The 1st Marquess Cornwallis, and promoted to the full rank of General in the British Army the following year. Lord Cornwallis later served, from 1798 to 1801, as the Lord Lieutenant of Ireland, where he oversaw the implementation of the Act of Union.

History

 Captain Francis Light, R.N., took possession of Penang Island from the Sultan of Kedah in 1786 and built the original fort. The fort's purpose was to protect Penang from pirates and Kedah. Captain Light, who died in 1794, renamed Penang Island as Prince of Wales Island in 1786.

In 1804, after the outbreak of the Napoleonic Wars, and during Colonel R.T. Farquhar's term as Governor of Prince of Wales Island (also known as Penang Island), Indian convict labourers rebuilt the fort using brick and stone. Fort Cornwallis was completed in 1810, at the cost of $80,000, during Norman Macalister’s term as Governor of Penang. A moat 9 metres wide by 2 metres deep once surrounded the fort but it was filled in the 1920s due to a malaria outbreak in the area.

Even though the fort was originally built for the British military, its function, historically, was more administrative than defensive. For example, the judge of the Supreme Court of Penang, Sir Edmond Stanley, an Anglo-Irish barrister, was first housed at Fort Cornwallis when the court opened on 31 May 1808. During the 1920s Sikh police of the Straits Settlements occupied the fort.

Royal Navy personnel under the direction of Rev. Peter Brown conducted an archaeological survey in July/August 1970. The fort was gazetted on 8 September 1977, under the Antiquities Act 168/1976, as an Ancient Monument and Historic site. Today, it has become one of Penang's prime tourist attractions.

Architecture
The Chapel at Fort Cornwallis was built in 1799. The first recorded marriage here took place that same year when John Timmers married Martina Rozells, Light's widow. The building in the southwest bastion is almost certainly not the chapel, but the main magazine; the massive roof  and the surrounding buttresses are typical of magazine buildings of the period. The building is the earliest roofed structure surviving in Penang from the colonial era.

Old cannons decorate the fort. The largest, known as Seri Rambai, was cast in 1603; in 1606 the Dutch East India Company gave it to the Sultan of Johore. In 1613, the Acehnese took possession of Seri Rambai and carried it to Aceh. In 1795, the Achenese gave it to Kuala Selangor. The British seized Seri Rambai in 1871 as  booty after a punitive raid on Kuala Selangor, and took the cannon to Penang. The government moved it to the fort in the 1950s.

A  skeletal steel lighthouse was erected in the northeast corner of the fort in 1882. It is the second oldest lighthouse in Malaysia, after the Cape Rachado Lighthouse at Tanjung Tuan, Malacca. Originally named Fort Point Lighthouse, it was renamed Penang Harbour Lighthouse after renovation in 1914 and 1925. The State Tourism Development Committee chairman claimed in 2006 that it was the only lighthouse in Malaysia that resembles a ship's mast, and the only one in Peninsular Malaysia not serving any navigational purpose.

Sources
 "Fort Cornwallis, Penang | Malaysia Travel Guide" - http://travelmalaysiaguide.com/fort-cornwallis-penang/#ixzz0ED0j1tO0&A 
 "Fort Cornwallis, Penang | Malaysia Travel Guide" - http://travelmalaysiaguide.com/fort-cornwallis-penang/#ixzz0ED1BjBSx&A

External links

 Tourism Malaysia - Fort Cornwallis

Cornwallis
Buildings and structures in George Town, Penang
Star forts
1786 establishments in the British Empire
Tourist attractions in George Town, Penang